Leopoldo Morales Garcia (born March 6, 1990) is a Mexican retired footballer.

External links
 Fort Lauderdale Strikers player profile

1990 births
Living people
Mexican expatriate footballers
Tigres UANL footballers
Fort Lauderdale Strikers players
Orange County SC players
People from Zamora, Michoacán
Footballers from Michoacán
Mexican footballers
Expatriate soccer players in the United States
North American Soccer League players
USL Championship players
Association football forwards